David Gonzalez Estudillo (born 1973) is an American lawyer serving as the Chief United States district judge of the United States District Court for the Western District of Washington. He is a former Washington state court judge.

Early life and education 

Estudillo was born and raised in Sunnyside, Washington, where his parents owned a small grocery store. He received a Bachelor of Arts from the University of Washington in 1996 and a Juris Doctor from the University of Washington School of Law in 1999.

Career 

After graduating law school, Estudillo began his legal career at Jeffers, Danielson, Sonn & Aylward in Wenatchee. From 2002 to 2005, he was an attorney with Scheer and Zehnder in the Seattle office, where his practice focused on complex civil litigation. From 2005 to 2015, he was a solo practitioner at Estudillo Law Firm PLLC, where he focused on immigration law and general civil litigation. The firm represented detained and non-detained clients before the Executive Office for Immigration Review and Board of Immigration Appeals. He also represented people seeking immigration benefits through applications filed with United States Citizenship and Immigration Services. In 2015, he was appointed by Governor Jay Inslee to serve as a judge for the Grant County Superior Court. and served until his elevation as a federal judge in 2021.

Federal judicial service 

On April 29, 2021, President Joe Biden nominated Estudillo to serve as a United States district judge for the United States District Court for the Western District of Washington to the seat vacated by Judge Ronald B. Leighton, who assumed senior status on February 28, 2019. On June 9, 2021, a hearing on his nomination was held before the Senate Judiciary Committee. On July 15, 2021, his nomination was reported out of committee by a 15–7 vote. On September 14, 2021, the Senate invoked cloture on his nomination by a 52–42 vote. Later that day, his nomination was confirmed by a 54–41 vote. He received his judicial commission on October 7, 2021. He became the chief judge on September 3, 2022, succeeding Ricardo S. Martinez.

See also 
 List of Hispanic/Latino American jurists

References

External links 

1973 births
Living people
20th-century American lawyers
21st-century American judges
21st-century American lawyers
Hispanic and Latino American judges
Hispanic and Latino American lawyers
Judges of the United States District Court for the Western District of Washington
Superior court judges in the United States
United States district court judges appointed by Joe Biden
University of Washington alumni
University of Washington School of Law alumni
Washington (state) state court judges